Sciaena is a genus of fish in the family Sciaenidae. They are native to Pacific, South America and Eastern Atlantic.

Species
There are currently 3 recognized species in this genus:
 Sciaena callaensis Hildebrand, 1946 
 Sciaena deliciosa Tschudi, 1846 (Lorna drum)
 Sciaena umbra Linnaeus, 1758 (Brown meagre)

References

Sciaenidae